Sunrise Airways S.A. is a Haitian airline that provides scheduled passenger and charter flights.

History
Sunrise Airways was founded in 2010 and commenced flights on a charter basis on January 1, 2011. In February 2011, the carrier began scheduled flights between Port-au-Prince and Jacmel in Haiti offering passenger, cargo and mail services. In July 2011, all scheduled flights stopped and the airline operated only on a charter basis. On December 20, 2012, it returned to scheduled service, offering two daily commercial flights between Port-au-Prince and Cap-Haïtien with its BAE Jetstream 32.

In October 2014, Sunrise Airways started a regularly scheduled service to Santiago de Cuba, the company's first commercial flights to Cuba. In March 2016, a second route to Cuba (Camaguey) was opened. In 2016 Sunrise was approved to by the United States Department of Transportation to offer flights between Haiti and multiple US destinations. From October 2016 through March 2017, it offered a seasonal service to Orlando International Airport.

In 2018. the airline acquired a Dominican operator, Servicios Aéreos Geca. It operates BAe Jetstream 32, with plans to transition to narrow body jet aircraft under the Sunrise Airways livery.

Destinations
As of January 2021, Sunrise Airways offers scheduled flights to five domestic and international destinations:

Fleet

Current fleet
As of January 2023, the Sunrise Airways fleet consists of the following aircraft:

Former fleet
Sunrise Airways formerly operated the following aircraft:

See also
List of airlines of Haiti

References

External links
Official website

2010 establishments in Haiti
Airlines of Haiti
Airlines established in 2010
Companies based in Port-au-Prince